Crime 360 is an American reality television show based on homicide detective units in various cities across the United States, including Richmond, Virginia; Rochester, New York; Little Rock, Arkansas; Indianapolis, Indiana; Cleveland, Ohio. The detective units in each of these cities use a Leica or a Deltasphere three-dimensional scanner to photograph the crime scene.

It is produced by BASE Productions.

Content
The show is a reality television series featuring "state-of-the-art 360-degree, digital photography and incredible CGI visualizations", according to press releases by A&E. The Leica Camera Scan Station was one such camera used on the show.

Critical reception
Barry Garron of The Hollywood Reporter gave the show a mostly negative review, stating that "there are a lot (actually, too much) of computer-generated graphics, but for the most part, this is just Cops with a community college degree." Kevin McDonough of the Daily Journal World was more positive, referring to the show as "CSI...without all of those Jerry Bruckheimer special effects".

References

External links
Crime 360 - The official A&E website of the show.
 

2000s American reality television series
2008 American television series debuts
2009 American television series endings
A&E (TV network) original programming
English-language television shows
Television shows set in the United States